The Wessex Ridgeway is a long-distance footpath in southwest England. It runs  from Marlborough in Wiltshire to Lyme Regis in Dorset, via the northern edge of Salisbury Plain and across Cranborne Chase AONB. The footpath was opened in 1994.

At Marlborough, the footpath meets the Ridgeway National Trail which continues into Oxfordshire and Buckinghamshire. Two further long-distance footpaths extend to Hunstanton in Norfolk; together, the four paths are referred to as the Greater Ridgeway.

Landmarks 

 Bell Hill
 Coney's Castle
 Lambert's Castle
 Pilsdon Pen
 Lewesdon Hill
 Waddon Hill
 Scratchbury Hill

External links 
 
 

1994 establishments in England
Footpaths in Wiltshire
Long-distance footpaths in Dorset
Protected areas of Dorset
Protected areas of Wiltshire
Wessex